The Clachan Bridge is a simple, single-arched, hump-backed, masonry bridge spanning the Clachan Sound,  southwest of Oban in Argyll, Scotland. It links the west coast of the Scottish mainland to the island of Seil.

The bridge was originally designed by John Stevenson of Oban (and not by Thomas Telford as sometimes quoted) and was built between 1792 and 1793 by engineer Robert Mylne. The bridge is still in use today, forming part of the B844 road, and is in the care of Historic Scotland.

Because the Clachan Sound connects at both ends to the Atlantic Ocean, and might therefore be considered part of that ocean, the bridge came to be known as the Bridge over the Atlantic. Such an appellation has also been applied to certain other bridges having similar situations, such as the Brúgvin um Streymin in the Faroe Islands and between Lewis and Great Bernera in the Outer Hebrides.

Wildlife
The south wall of the bridge has been colonised by fairy foxglove (Erinus alpinus).

Occasionally whales have become trapped in the narrow Clachan Sound.

References

Seil
Bridges completed in 1793
Category A listed buildings in Argyll and Bute
Listed bridges in Scotland
Road bridges in Scotland
Bridges in Argyll and Bute
1793 establishments in Great Britain